Ermal Hadribeaj (born October 12, 1993) is an Albanian–American professional boxer and former professional mixed martial artist.

Boxing career
Hadribeaj made his boxing debut in 2019. Hadribeaj won the WBC Mediterranean Super Welterweight title on September 25, 2021, against Thodoris Ritzakis by unanimous decision. He was on the wrong side of a double leg takedown during his WBC NABF title victory bout against Daniel Biaz on February 19, 2022. He defended his NABF title on May 13, 2022, against Sidney da Rosa Manuel, winning by unanimous decision. On November 12, 2022, Hadribeaj defeated Daniel Buciuc  by unanimous decision to win the WBC International Title.

Mixed Martial Arts career
Hadribeaj competed in MMA from 2016 to 2019. He recorded a 4–3 record as an amateur and a 4–1 record as a professional. Hadribeaj represented Team Albania at the 2016 IMMAF European Open Championship going 1–1, the 2017 IMMAF European Open Championship going 0–1 and the 2017 IMMAF World Championships going 3–1 losing in the semi-finals.

Professional Mixed martial arts record 

|-
|
|align=center|4–1
|Ryan McIntosh
|TKO (Submission to body kick)
| WXC 80 WARRIOR WEDNESDAY 5
|
|align=center|1
|align=center|3:12
|Southgate, Michigan, United States
|-
|
|align=center|3–1
|Lou Radecki
|TKO (punches)
| TRIPLE X CAGEFIGHTING LEGENDS 79
|
|align=center|2
|align=center|2:23
|Livonia, Michigan, United States
|-->
|-
|
|align=center|2–1
|Antoine Gray
|TKO (punches)
|TRIPLE X CAGEFIGHTING LEGENDS 12
|
|align=center|1
|align=center|2:25
|Livonia, Michigan, United States
|
|-
|
|align=center|1–1
|Omar Lila
|KO (Head Kick)
|AGC 3 ALBANIAN GLADIATOR CHAMPIONSHIP 3
|
|align=center|1
|align=center|3:43
|Tirana, Albania
|-
|Loss
|align=center|0–1
|Panagiotis Stroumpoulis
|Unanimous Decision 
| Cage Survivor: Fight Nightmare King Pyrros
|
|align=center|3
|align=center|5:00
|Ioannina, Greece
|
|-

Professional boxing record

References

1993 births
Living people
Albanian male boxers
Light-middleweight boxers